Mihai Nicolau (born 29 January 1949) is a Romanian bobsledder. He competed in the four man event at the 1976 Winter Olympics.

References

1949 births
Living people
Romanian male bobsledders
Olympic bobsledders of Romania
Bobsledders at the 1976 Winter Olympics
Place of birth missing (living people)